Sharon Patricia Maughan (born 22 June 1950) is a British actress.

Early life
Sharon Mughan grew up in Kirkby, Lancashire, with her four siblings. She later changed her surname to "Maughan".

Career

Upon graduating from RADA, Maughan gained her Equity Card while playing Ophelia in an Open University tour of Hamlet. She then did rep at the Liverpool Playhouse and Chester, and won her first television opportunity in Philip Mackie's The Organisation, starring Peter Egan. This led to episodes of The Last of the Baskets with Patricia Hayes, then Justice with Margaret Lockwood. In 1973, Maughan was chosen for the role of Rachel Rosing in a Granada Television serialisation of Howard Spring's novel, Shabby Tiger.

Maughan immediately went on to work with Elaine Stritch, playing the title role in If You Knew Susie, which was part of the TV series Dial M For Murder. This led to Alan Bennett asking her to appear alongside him at the Lyric Theatre in his original production of Habeas Corpus, playing "Felicity Rumpers". She next worked with John Stride in the final series of Yorkshire Television's The Main Chance, playing the Nordic "Inge Lindstrom". David Mercer's controversial Huggy Bear with the infamous 'chocasms' scene was her next television venture.

In 1977, Maughan joined the cast of Franco Zeffirelli's Filumena, starring Joan Plowright and Colin Blakely in London's West End, where she met her future husband, actor Trevor Eve. Maughan then went on to star in such series as The Enigma Files, The Flame Trees of Thika, Dombey and Son, and By the Sword Divided. As a result of the success of The Flame Trees of Thika in America, Maughan was invited to do an episode of MacGyver. From 1987 to 1998, while running the internationally successful "Gold Blend couple" television advertisements for Nescafé  (Taster's Choice in the United States) alongside actor Anthony Head, she starred in episodes of Inspector Morse, Hannay, and Murder, She Wrote. Onstage, she played Billie Dawn in Born Yesterday, Anne Daviot in Adam Was a Gardener, Nora in A Doll's House at Chichester Festival Theatre, and Elizabeth Cady Stanton and Anna Howard Shaw in Paula Wagner's production of Out of Our Father's House at Hollywood's Fountainhead Theatre.

In 1993, she received excellent reviews for her debut directorial production of Widowers' Houses in London. In 1997, she and her husband, Trevor Eve, founded Projector Productions with Charles Haswell. With Trevor as producer, she went on to executive produce and star in Cinderella alongside Kathleen Turner, and executive produce Twelfth Night, starring Chiwetel Ejiofor. That same year, Maughan co-starred in Another Stakeout with Richard Dreyfuss.

Upon finishing the "Gold Blend couple" television campaign in 1998, she went back to the theatre to do And All the Children Cried, playing Myra Hindley, which was immediately followed by Maughan joining the cast of the BBC One medical drama television series Holby City, which she left in late 2006 to appear in Roger Donaldson's The Bank Job. This was quickly followed by guest leads in the BBC's Waking the Dead, starring Eve as Superintendent Peter Boyd, and Kidnap and Ransom, also starring Eve.

After premiering the new play Cradle Me, co-starring Luke Treadaway, Maughan went on to appear in the 2010 US film She's Out of My League, in the role of Molly's mother – the lead female character played by her real life daughter Alice. Nathan's husband, Trevor Eve, played Molly's father. With Lysette Anthony, Maughan was also part of the cast for the 15-minute short film, A Study After Cruel Intentions.

In the 2011 series of Celebrity MasterChef, an ill-prepared Maughan was shocked and delighted to make it to the semi-final. This was followed by a film made each year from 2012 to 2014: The Babymakers, directed by Jay Chandrasekhar; Flying Home directed by Dominique Derudiere, and Time Lapse, directed by Bradley King; and finally The Atticus Institute, directed by Chris Sparling – all shot in the USA.

On 19 February 2014, she was part of the invited audience at Buckingham Palace to celebrate the centenary of the Royal Academy of Dramatic Art. She and Trevor were then asked to perform in front of the Queen in the Investiture Room, along with Hugh Laurie, Sir Tom Courtenay and Dame Helen Mirren.

Maughan appeared in her son Jack Eve's debut feature film as writer/director, Death of a Farmer, which having had a screening at the Dinard Film Festival, had its UK Premiere at the Borderlines Film Festival on 5 March 2014.

In September 2014, Maughan starred in the British premiere of Neil LaBute's well received play Autobahn at the King's Head Theatre in Islington. She finished the play with a 30-minute monologue. She later appeared in the film Untitled playing the drug dealing mastermind controller of a struggling filmmaker.

In November 2015 she joined the programme Loose Women as a guest panellist.

Personal life
In 1977, she met actor Trevor Eve, and they were married in 1980. In 1982, Maughan gave birth to their first child, Alice, now an actress. They have two other children.

Filmography

References

External links

1950 births
Actors from Kirkby
Actresses from Liverpool
Alumni of RADA
English people of Irish descent
English film actresses
English soap opera actresses
English television actresses
Living people